Uruçuca is a municipality in the state of Bahia in the North-East region of Brazil.

The municipality contains 44% of the  Serra do Conduru State Park, created in 1997.
It also contains part of the  Lagoa Encantada e Rio Almada Environmental Protection Area, created in 1993.

See also
List of municipalities in Bahia

References

Populated coastal places in Bahia
Municipalities in Bahia